The Mike Wieringo Comic Book Industry Awards, commonly shortened to the Ringo Awards, are prizes given for achievement in comic books. They are named in honor of artist Mike Wieringo and they were founded by the Reisterstown, Maryland-based Cards, Comics, & Collectibles shop alongside the Ringo Awards Committee in 2017, their ceremony meant to succeed the Harvey Awards which left the Baltimore Comic-Con as its venue in 2016.

The Ringo Awards are nominated by an open vote among comic-book professionals and fans. The winners are selected from the top two fan choices as the first two nominees and the professional jury selects the remaining three nominees in each category.

History 
The Ringo Awards were created as an industry award voted by comics professionals and its fans. The first Ringo Awards were presented at the Baltimore Comic-Con on September 23, 2017. The 2018 awards took place at the Baltimore Comic-Con on September 29, 2018. The 2019 awards were held October 19, 2019 at the Baltimore Comic-Con. The 2020 awards were held October 24, 2020 at Baltimore Comic-Con Live, the Baltimore Comic-Con's virtual live-streaming event held during COVID-19.

Categories
The Ringo Awards are awarded in the following categories:

Current
, awards are presented in 23 categories for works published in 2020.

Perennial Jury Nomination:
 The Mike Wieringo Spirit Award (2017–present)

Fan-Only Nominations:
 Favorite Hero (2017–present)
 Favorite Villain (2017–present)
 Favorite New Series (2017–present)
 Favorite New Talent (2017–present)
 Favorite Publisher (2018–present)

Fan and Pro Nomination Categories:
 Best Cartoonist (Writer/Artist) (2017–present)
 Best Writer (2017–present)
 Best Artist or Penciller (2017–present)
 Best Inker (2017–present)
 Best Letterer (2017–present)
 Best Colorist (2017–present)
 Best Cover Artist (2017–present)
 Best Series (2017–present)
 Best Single Issue or Story (2017–present)
 Best Original Graphic Novel (2017–present)
 Best Anthology (2017–present)
 Best Humor Comic (2017–present)
 Best Webcomic (2017–present)
 Best Humor Webcomic (2021–present)
 Best Non-fiction Comic Work (2017–present)
 Best Kids Comic or Graphic Novel (2018–present)
 Best Presentation in Design (2017–present)

Past awards
Fan and Pro Nomination Categories:
 Best Comic Strip or Panel (2017–2020)

Award winners

Characters

[Fan] Favorite Hero

 2017 Cash Wayne from Spectrum (WEBTOON)
 2018 Mags from Assassin Roommate (WEBTOON)
 2019 Toaster Dude from Toaster Dude (WEBTOON)
 2020 Clove from SubZero (WEBTOON)
 2021 Persephone from Lore Olympus (WEBTOON)
 2022 Sylas from Syphon (Image Comics)

[Fan] Favorite Villain

 2017 Arlo from unOrdinary (WEBTOON)
 2018 Arlo from unOrdinary (WEBTOON)
 2019 Lance Cordrey from Aberrant (Action Lab Entertainment)
 2020 John from unOrdinary (WEBTOON)
 2021 Emma from My Deepest Secret (WEBTOON)
 2022 Captain Martell from Blowback (self-published)

Companies

[Fan] Favorite Publisher

 2018 Line Webtoon
 2019 Dynamite Entertainment
 2020 Tapas
 2021 Rocketship Entertainment
 2022 Image Comics

People

[Fan] Favorite New Talent

 2017 instantmiso
 2018 Quimchee
 2019 Enjelicious
 2020 Sinran
 2021 Lilydusk
 2022 Vincent Kings

Best Cartoonist (Writer/Artist)

 2017 Skottie Young
 2018 Joelle Jones
 2019 Terry Moore
 2020 Stan Sakai
 2021 Stan Sakai
 2022 Jeff Lemire

Best Writer

 2017 Tom King
 2018 Tom King
 2019 Brian K. Vaughan
 2020 Mariko Tamaki
 2021 James Tynion IV
 2022 James Tynion IV

Best Artist or Penciller

 2017 Fiona Staples
 2018 Lee Weeks
 2019 Sean Phillips
 2020 Sanford Greene
 2021 Jamal Campbell
 2022 Filipe Andrade

Best Inker

 2017 Sean Murphy
 2018 Mark Morales
 2019 Fiona Staples
 2020 Sandra Hope
 2021 Sanford Greene
 2022 Sal Buscema

Best Letterer

 2017 Todd Klein
 2018 Todd Klein
 2019 Todd Klein
 2020 Nate Piekos
 2021 Aditya Bidikar
 2022 Taylor Esposito

Best Colorist

 2017 Laura Martin
 2018 Dave Stewart
 2019 Tamra Bonvillain
 2020 Jordie Bellaire
 2021 Tamra Bonvillain
 2022 Dave McCaig

Best Cover Artist

 2017 Frank Cho
 2018 Michael Cho
 2019 Fiona Staples
 2020 Sana Takeda
 2021 Peach Momoko
 2022 Simone Di Meo

Works

Mike Wieringo Spirit Award

 2017 Future Quest #1, DC Comics
 2018 Mech Cadet Yu, BOOM! Studios
 2019 Isola, Image Comics
 2020 Superman Smashes the Klan, DC Comics
 2021 Folklords, BOOM! Studios'
 2022 Jonna and the Unpossible Monsters, Oni Press

[Fan] Favorite New Series

 2017 Spectrum
 2018 I Love Yoo
 2019 Luff
 2020 Fangs
 2021 Midnight Poppy Land
 2022 Clinic of Horrors

Best Series

 2017 Vision, Marvel Comics
 2018 Mister Miracle, DC Comics
 2019 
 2020 Bitter Root, Image Comics
 2021 Usagi Yojimbo, IDW Publishing
 2022 Something Is Killing the Children, BOOM! Studios

Best Single Issue or Story

 2017 Emancipation Day, www.redistrictedcomics.com
 2018 Batman/Elmer Fudd Special, DC Comics
 2019 Swamp Thing Winter Special, DC Comics
 2020 Usagi Yojimbo #6, IDW Publishing
 2021 The O.Z., self-published
 2022 Something Is Killing the Children #20, BOOM! Studios

Best Original Graphic Novel

 2017 March: Book III, Top Shelf Productions
 2018 My Favorite Thing Is Monsters, Fantagraphics
 2019 My Heroes Have Always Been Junkies, Image Comics
 2020 Snow, Glass, Apples, Dark Horse Comics
 2021 Pulp, Image Comics
 2022 Did You Hear What Eddie Gein Done?, Albatross Funnybooks

Best Anthology

 2017 Love is Love, DC Comics/IDW Publishing
 2018 Mine! A Celebration of Liberty and Freedom for All Benefiting Planned Parenthood, ComicMix
 2019 Where We Live, A Benefit for the Survivors in Las Vegas, Image Comics
 2020 Jim Henson's The Storyteller: Sirens, Archaia (BOOM! Studios)
 2021 Be Gay, Do Comics, IDW Publishing
 2022 DC Pride 2021, DC Comics

Best Humor Comic

 2017 I Hate Fairyland, Image Comics
 2018 Batman/Elmer Fudd Special, DC Comics
 2019 MAD, DC Comics
 2020 Superman's Pal Jimmy Olsen, DC Comics
 2021 Metalshark Bro 2: Assault on Hamzig Island, Scout Comics
 2022 Not All Robots, AWA Studios

Best Comic Strip or Panel

 2017 Bloom County, Berkeley Breathed, Universal Uclick
 2018 Sarah's Scribbles, Sarah Andersen, Andrews McMeel Universal
 2019 Nancy, Olivia Jaimes, Andrews McMeel Universal
 2020 Nancy, Olivia Jaimes, Andrews McMeel Universal

Best Webcomic

 2017 The Red Hook, Dean Haspiel
 2018 1000, Chuck Brown and Sanford Greene
 2019 The Nib, various
 2020 Fried Rice, Erica Eng
 2021 Fangs, Sarah Andersen
 2022 Lore Olympus, Rachel Smythe

Best Humor Webcomic

 2021 Sarah's Scribbles, Sarah Andersen
 2022 Sarah's Scribbles, Sarah Andersen

Best Non-fiction Comic Work

 2017 March: Book III, Top Shelf Productions
 2018 The Best We Could Do, Abrams ComicArts
 2019 Where We Live, A Benefit for the Survivors in Las Vegas, Image Comics
 2020 They Called Us Enemy, Top Shelf (IDW Publishing)
 2021 Kent State: Four Dead in Ohio, Abrams Books
 2022 Did You Hear What Eddie Gein Done?, Albatross Funnybooks

Best Kids Comic or Graphic Novel

 2018 DC SuperHero Girls, DC Comics
 2019 Punk Taco, Adam Wallenta Entertainment
 2020 Guts, Graphix/Scholastic
 2021 Twins, Graphix/Scholastic
 2022 Avatar: The Last Airbender–Suki, Alone., Dark Horse Comics

Best Presentation in Design

 2017 Mike Mignola’s Screw-On Head and Other Curious Objects: Artist’s Edition Hardcover, IDW Publishing
 2018 Saga, Image Comics
 2019 Absolute Sandman Overture, DC Comics
 2020 Stan Sakai's Usagi Yojimbo: The Complete Grasscutter Artist Select, IDW Publishing
 2021 Dave Cockrum’s X-Men Artifact Edition, IDW Publishing
 2022 Did You Hear What Eddie Gein Done?, Albatross Funnybooks

See also
Other comic-related awards given at the Baltimore Comic-Con:
Dick Giordano Humanitarian of the Year Award (2010–present)
Harvey Awards (2006–2016)
Hero Initiative Lifetime Achievement Award (2006–present)

References

External links

Comics awards
Awards established in 2017
2017 establishments in the United States